Samotino Point (‘Nos Samotino’ \'nos sa-'mo-ti-no\) is the ice-covered point on the southeast side of the entrance to Pizos Bay on Nordenskjöld Coast in Graham Land, Antarctica.  It was formed as a result of glacier retreat in the last decade of 20th century.

The feature is named after the settlement of Samotino in northeastern Bulgaria.

Location
SCAR Antarctic Digital Database mapping in 2012.

Maps
Antarctic Digital Database (ADD). Scale 1:250000 topographic map of Antarctica. Scientific Committee on Antarctic Research (SCAR). Since 1993, regularly upgraded and updated.

References
 Samotino Point. SCAR Composite Antarctic Gazetteer.
 Bulgarian Antarctic Gazetteer. Antarctic Place-names Commission. (details in Bulgarian, basic data in English)

External links
 Samotino Point. Copernix satellite image

Headlands of Graham Land
Nordenskjöld Coast
Bulgaria and the Antarctic